Norman Atkinson (25 March 1923 – 8 July 2013) was a British politician who served as Labour Member of Parliament for the London constituency of Tottenham from 1964 until 1987.

Early life
Manchester-born, Atkinson was educated at technical school and became a design engineer at Manchester University.

Political career
Atkinson was a councillor on Manchester City Council 1945–49. He contested Manchester Wythenshawe in 1955 and Altrincham and Sale in 1959, before being elected for Tottenham in the 1964 general election.

A member of Labour's National Executive Committee for five years, Atkinson also served as the party's national treasurer from 1976 to 1981. As treasurer, he clashed with Chancellor Denis Healey at the 1976 Labour Party Conference. He was a founding member of the Socialist Campaign Group.

He did not contest the 1987 general election, having been deselected by his constituency party (subsequent to boundary changes in 1983 which added roughly half of the old Wood Green constituency) in favour of Bernie Grant.

Later life
After he ceased being an MP, Atkinson authored a book on Sir Joseph Whitworth (The World’s Best Mechanician, 1996) and a play (Old Merrypebbles).

Sources
 http://www.spartacus-educational.com/TUatkinsonN.htm
 http://news.bbc.co.uk/1/hi/uk_politics/706403.stm

Notes

1923 births
2013 deaths
Amalgamated Engineering Union-sponsored MPs
Councillors in Manchester
Labour Party (UK) MPs for English constituencies
People from Tottenham
UK MPs 1964–1966
UK MPs 1966–1970
UK MPs 1970–1974
UK MPs 1974
UK MPs 1974–1979
UK MPs 1979–1983
UK MPs 1983–1987